La Trinité (or simply ; Nissard: La Ternita Vitour) is a commune in the Alpes-Maritimes department, southeastern France.

History
Formerly a small town located on Kingdom of Piedmont-Sardinia main road from Nice to capital Turin, it is located on the left bank of the Paillon river. It has been French since 1860.

The city is known for the Laghet sanctuary.

Population

Personalities
 Priscilla : pop singer born in La Trinité
 Nekfeu : rapper born in La Trinité

See also
Communes of the Alpes-Maritimes department
List of medieval bridges in France

References

Communes of Alpes-Maritimes
Alpes-Maritimes communes articles needing translation from French Wikipedia